Antoine Chazal (8 November 1793 in Paris – 12 August 1854 in Paris) was a French painter of flowers and of portraits, as well as an engraver. He studied under Misbach, Bidauld, and Van Spaendonck, and became Professor of Iconography at the Jardin des Plantes. Besides portraits, flowers, and fruit, he painted a few landscapes and altar-pieces for churches. He also engraved a portrait of Cardinal La Fare. Chazal died in Paris in 1854.

Engravings 
Chazal drew many effigies for the engraver and publisher Ambroise Tardieu, who does not mention it in his prints (see below the legends of the portraits)

References

1793 births
1854 deaths
Painters from Paris
19th-century French painters
French male painters
French engravers
19th-century engravers
19th-century French male artists
18th-century French male artists